Valerie Anand (born 1937) is a British author of historical fiction.

Fiction
Under the pen name Fiona Buckley she writes the series of historical mysteries, set in the reign of Elizabeth I of England, featuring "Ursula Blanchard" (whose full name is Ursula Faldene Blanchard de la Roche Stannard). Under her own name she writes historical fiction based on the royalty of England and the Bridges over Time series which follows a family from the eleventh century through the twentieth century. She has also written To a Native Shore,  a contemporary novel that explores British prejudice toward Indian Sikhs.

She also holds the copyrights to The Fallen Pinnacle, a 1997 novel about Atlantis written under the pseudonym Valerie M. Irwin.

Ursula Blanchard mysteries
 To Shield the Queen (1998) 
 The Doublet Affair (1998) 
 Queen's Ransom (2000) 
 To Ruin a Queen (2000) 
 Queen of Ambition (2002) 
 A Pawn for a Queen (2002) 
 Fugitive Queen (2004) 
 The Siren Queen (2004) 
 Queen Without a Crown (2011) 
 Queen's Bounty (2012) 
 A Rescue for a Queen (2013)
 A Traitor's Tears (2014) 
 A Perilous Alliance (2015) 
 The Heretic's Creed (2017) 
 A Deadly Betrothal (2017) 
 A Web of Silk (2019)

Bridges Over Time series
 The Proud Villeins (1992) 
 The Ruthless Yeomen (1991) 
 The Women of Ashdon (1993) 
 The Faithful Lovers (1993) 
 The Cherished Wives (1996) 
 The Dowerless Sisters (1995)

Norman series
 Gildenford (1977) 
 The Norman Pretender (1982) 
 The Disputed Crown (1982)

Other historical novels
 King of the Wood (1984)  (2016) 
 based on King William Rufus
 Crown of Roses (1989) 
 based on the end of the Wars of the Roses
 The House of Lanyon - The Exmoor Saga (2007) 
 Story of Richard Lanyon, his descendants, and his landlords the Sweetwaters
 The House Of Allerbrook - The Exmoor Saga (2008) 
 Story of Jane Sweetwater (Allerbrook)

Other novels
 To a Native Shore: A Novel of India (1984)

Innocence of King Richard III
Valerie Anand is a believer in the innocence of King Richard III in the matter of the Princes in the Tower, i.e. a Ricardian. She presents this view in Crown of Roses, making the point that the former tutor of Edward V, John Alcock, remained on good terms with the king, which he presumably would not have done had he suspected him of being responsible for the death of his former student.

References

External links
Interview with Valerie Anand
King Of The Wood by Valerie Anand

1937 births
British historical novelists
English women novelists
Living people
Women mystery writers
20th-century English novelists
21st-century English novelists
21st-century English women writers
20th-century English women writers
Women historical novelists
Writers of historical fiction set in the early modern period